RajBali Pandey was an Indian writer and author who authored several books on Socio-Religious study of the Hindu sacraments and Vedas.

Career 
Dr. Raj Bali Pandey started his career as editor of "Kalyan", published by Geeta Press and also as tutor of Ramabai, daughter of Ramkrishna Dalmia. He got appointment in Banaras Hindu University in 1936 by Mahamana Pandit Madan Mohan Malaviya. He got promoted as Reader by the then Vice-Chancellor Dr. Sarvepalli Radhakrishnan. He was appointed as Head & Principal, College of Indology (Bharati Mahavidyalaya) in 1952.

Due to political pressure he left the B.H.U and joined Rani Durgavati University (Jabalpur University) as Professor and Head, department of Ancient Indian History, Culture & Archeology. In 1967, he became the Vice-Chancellor of Jabalpur University and worked till his death as Vice-Chancellor.

Academic Posts Held 

 Assistant professor, B.H.U (1936 - 1946).
 Professor, B.H.U (1946 - 1952).
 University Professor, B.H.U. (1952 - 1960).
 Principal, College of Indology (1952 - 1960).
 Malviya Professor of Ancient Indian History and Culture, Rani Durgavati University (1961).
 Vice-Chancellor, Rani Durgavati University (1968).

Publications 

Hindu Samskaras: 
Atharvaveda:  
Pocket Guide to Popular Hinduism:  
Rigveda:  
Samveda: 
Yajurveda: 
Pracheen Bharat: 
Bhartiya Puralipi: 
Vikramaditya of Ujjaini 
Vikramaditya Samvat Pravartak  
Chandragupta II Vikramāditya 
Bhartiya Itihās ki Bhumika
Bhartiya Itihās ka Parichaya 
Yaduvansh kā Itihās All-India Yadav Mahasabha
Indian Paleography 
Ashok ke Abhilekh 
Historical and Literary Inscriptions 
Bhāratīya nīti kā vikāsa 
Varanasi, the heart of Hinduism 
Hindu Dharma-Kosh: 
Svargīya Padmabhūshaṇa Paṇḍita Kuñjīlāla Dube smr̥ti-grantha 
Hindī sāhitya kā br̥hat itihāsa 
Popular Hinduism at a glance 
Gorakhpur Janpad aur uski kshatriya jātiyon kā itihās

See also
Faculty of Arts, Banaras Hindu University
Banaras Hindu University

References

1907 births
1971 deaths
Banaras Hindu University alumni
Banaras Hindu University people
Indian religious writers
Writers from Varanasi
Hindu writers
Hindi-language writers